Heike Popel was an East German luger who competed during the 1980s. She won the silver medal in the women's singles event 1984 FIL European Luge Championships in Olang, Italy.

References
List of European luge champions 

German female lugers
Living people
Year of birth missing (living people)